General Nugent may refer to:

George Colborne Nugent (1864–1915), British Army brigadier general
Oliver Nugent (1860–1926), British Army major general
Richard E. Nugent (1902–1979), U.S. Air Force lieutenant general
Sir George Nugent, 1st Baronet (1757–1849), British Army general